Nationality words link to articles with information on the nation's poetry or literature (for instance, Irish or France).

Events
 In Nazi Germany the Reichsschrifttumskammer (the National Socialist authors' association) bans German expressionist poet Gottfried Benn from further writing.
 The Arbujad ("Soothsayers") group of Estonian poets forms.

Works published in English

Australia
 Rex Ingamells and Ian Tilbrook, Conditional Culture, published in Adelaide; a manifesto advocating a "fundamental break ... with the spirit of English culture" to free Australian art from "alien influences" and paying more attention to Aboriginal culture as well as the use of "only such imagery as is truly Australian"; the word "Jindyworobak", which they understood to be an Aboriginal term meaning 'to annex' or 'to join', they proposed as a symbol of the reorientation; the Jindyworobak Movement resulted in at least 44 volumes of poetry and literary comment in addition to periodicals from this year through 1953; criticism
 Rex Ingamells:
 Sun-freedom, Adelaide
 Editor, Jindyworobak Anthology, Adelaide
 Shaw Neilson, Beauty Imposes: Some Recent Verse, Angus & Robertson

Canada
 Kenneth Leslie, By Stubborn Stars. Toronto: Ryerson. Governor-General's Award 1938.
 L. A. MacKay, Viper's Bugloss.
 Virna Sheard, Leaves in the Wind.
 Arthur Stringer, The Old Woman Remembers and Other Irish Poems. Indianapolis: Bobbs-Merrill.

India, in English
 Joseph Furtado, Songs in Exile  ( Poetry in English ), Bombay: self-published
 Cyril Modak, editor, The Indian Gateway to Poetry  ( Poetry in English ),  Calcutta: Longmans, Green; anthology
 K. S. R. Sastry, The Light of Life  ( Poetry in English )

United Kingdom
 Elizabeth Daryush, Verses: Sixth Book
 Cecil Day-Lewis, Overtures to Death, and Other Poems
 Walter de la Mare, Memory, and Other Poems
 David Gascoyne, Holderlin's Madness
 Stella Gibbons, The Lowland Venus, and Other Poems
 Oliver St. John Gogarty, Others to Adorn, preface by W. B. Yeats
 Poems of Today, British poetry anthology, third series
 Robert Graves, Collected Poems
 Louis MacNeice:
 The Earth Compels
 I Crossed the Minch, prose, with verse
 Stevie Smith, Tender Only to One
 Charles Williams, Taliessen Through Logres
 W. B. Yeats, New Poems, including "Lapis Lazuli", Irish poet published in the United Kingdom

United States
 Cleanth Brooks and Robert Penn Warren, editors, Understanding Poetry, criticism and anthology, (appearing thereafter in revised editions to 1976)
 E. E. Cummings, Collected Poems
 Donald Davidson, Lee in the Mountains
 Kenneth Fearing, Dead Reckoning
 John Gould Fletcher, Selected Poems
 Archibald MacLeish, Land of the Free
 Ogden Nash, I'm a Stranger Here Myself
 Ezra Pound, Guide to Kulchur, dedicated "To Louis Zukofsky and Basil Bunting strugglers in the desert"
 Frederic Prokosch, The Carnival
 Laura Riding, Collected Poems
 Muriel Rukeyser, U.S. 1
 Delmore Schwartz, In Dreams Begin Responsibilities
 E. B. White, The Fox of Peapack
 William Carlos Williams, The Complete Collected Poems of William Carlos Williams, 1906-1938, New Directions

Other in English
 Austin Clarke, Night and Morning, Irish poet published in Ireland
 A. R. D. Fairburn, Dominion, New Zealand poet
 Robin Hyde, New Zealand:
Nor the Years Condemn
 The Godwits Fly
 Ewart Milne, Forty North Fifty West, Irish poet published in Ireland
 W. B. Yeats, New Poems, including "Lapis Lazuli", Irish poet published in the United Kingdom

Works published in other languages

France
 Paul Éluard, pen name of Paul-Eugène Grindel, Cours naturel
 Pierre Emmanuel, pen name of Noël Mathieu, Christ au tombeau, the author's first poem
 Luc Estang, Au-delà de moi-même
 Pierre Jean Jouve, Kyrie
 Jules Supervielle, La Fable du monde

Indian subcontinent
Including all of the British colonies that later became India, Pakistan, Bangladesh, Sri Lanka and Nepal. Listed alphabetically by first name, regardless of surname:
 Ajit Kumar Datta, Patal Kanya, Bengali
 Bharatidasan, Paratitacan Kavitakal, Tamil
 Daya Singh Arif, Zindagi Bilas, a long poem, Punjabi
 Sir Muhammad Iqbal, Armaghan-i-Hijaz ("Gift from Hijaz"), philosophical poetry book in Persian
 Rabindranath Tagore, Prantik, Bengali
 Ramnarayan Vishvanath Pathak, Gujarati:
 Sesnan Kavyo, 73 Gujarati poems, including sonnets, bhajans and 
 Arvacin Kavyasahityanan Vaheno, five lectures on modern Gujarati poetry
 Rayaprolu Subba Rao, Ramyalokam, this verse work in Telugu "is accepted as the manifesto of bhava kavita (romantic poetry)", according to academic Siser Kumar Das
 Sacchidananda Rout Roy, Baji Raut ("The Boatman Boy"), Indian, Oriya-language
 Sumitranandan Pant, Yugvani, Hindi
 Ubaidullah Mahshar and Ashfaq Husain Khan Gaurakhpuri, Yadgar-i Mahshar, Urdu
 Mehr Lal Soni Zia Fatehabadi, Zia Ke Sau Sher (A Hundred Verses of Zia) - Collection of quotes  published by Gajender Lal Soni, Mohan Building, near Lloyd's Bank, Delhi in 1938.Urdu

Other languages
 Nathan Alterman, Stars Outside, Israel
 Nikos Kazantzakis, The Odyssey: A Modern Sequel, Greek
 Kersti Merilaas, Estonia
 Gabriela Mistral, Tala ("Harvesting"), Buenos Aires: Sur; Chilean poet published in Argentina
 María Pemán, Poema de la bestia y el angel ("Poem of the Beast and the Angel"); Spain
 Emil Staiger, Die Zeit als Einbildungskraft des Dichters, Germany (scholarship)
 Tin Ujević, Skalpel kaosa ("Scalpel of Chaos"), Croatian
 Xavier Villaurrutia, Nostalgia de la muerte, Mexico

Awards and honors
 Hawthornden Prize: David Jones for In Parenthesis
 Newdigate Prize: Michael Thwaites 
 Pulitzer Prize for Poetry: Marya Zaturenska: Cold Morning Sky
 Governor General's Award, poetry or drama: By Stubborn Stars, Kenneth Leslie
 Rugby School poetry prize: John Gillespie Magee, Jr.

Births
Death years link to the corresponding "[year] in poetry" article:
 January 13 – Nabaneeta Dev Sen (died 2019), Bengali writer and poet
 January 21 – Julia Fields, African American
 February 13 – Frances Horovitz (died 1983), English poet, broadcaster and performer of poetry
 February 18 – Elke Erb, German
 February 22
 Ishmael Reed, American poet, essayist and novelist
 George Thaniel (died 1991), Greek poet and classical scholar working in Canada
 March 18 – Michael S. Harper (died 2016), African American
 March 24 – Ian Hamilton (died 2001), English literary critic, reviewer, biographer, poet, magazine editor and publisher
 April 18 – Jwalamukhi జ్వాలాముఖీ, pen name of Veeravalli Raghavacharyulu (died 2008), Indian, Telugu-language poet, novelist, writer and political activist
 May 9 – Charles Simic, American
 May 11 – Joan Margarit (died 2021), Catalan Spanish poet and architect
 May 25 – Raymond Carver (died 1988), American short-story writer and poet
 June 1 – Khawar Rizvi (died 1981), Pakistani poet, scholar
 June 13 – John Newlove (died 2003), Canadian
 July 19
 Dom Moraes (died 2004), Indian writer, poet and columnist
 Tom Raworth (died 2017), English poet and visual artist; influential figure in the British Poetry Revival movement
 August 10 – Momoko Kuroda, 黒田杏子, Japanese haiku poet and essayist
 August 21 – Peter Dale, English poet and translator
 August ? – Deena Linett, American
 September 2 – Carlo Bordini (died 2020), Italian
 September 16 – Betty Adcock, American
 September 17 – H. H. ter Balkt (died 2015), Dutch
 September 19 – Keorapetse Kgositsile (died 2018), South African
 September 22 – Tajal Bewas, pen name of Taj Mohammed Samoo (died 2008), bucolic Sufi poet, novelist, short-story writer, teacher and Pakistani government official
 October 9 – Gwendoline Konie (died 2009), Zambian poet and politician
 October 13 – Askia M. Touré, African American
 October 17 – Les Murray (died 2019), Australian
 October 23 – R. F. Langley (died 2011), English
 November 7 – LeRoy Clarke (died 2021), Trinidadian poet and visual artist
 November 12 – Belal Chowdhury (died 2018), Bangladeshi
 Also:
 Brendan Galvin, American
 Alan Jackson, English-born Scottish
 Robert Phillips, American poet and academic
 Sansei Yamao (died 2001), Japanese poet and friend of American poet Gary Snyder

Deaths
Birth years link to the corresponding "[year] in poetry" article:

 March 1 – Gabriele D'Annunzio (born 1863), Italian poet, writer, novelist, dramatist, soldier, political figure and daredevil
 March 10 – Angiolo Silvio Novaro (born 1866), Italian poet and children's writer
 March 31 – Willem Kloos (born 1859), Dutch poet and critic
 April 15 – César Vallejo (born 1892), Peruvian poet
 April 19 – Sir Henry Newbolt (born 1862), English author and poet
 April 21 – Sir Muhammad Iqbal (aka "Allama Iqbal" [Urdu] and "Iqbal-e-Lahori" [Persian]; born 1877), Indian Muslim poet, philosopher and politician, writing in Persian and Urdu, praised as Muffakir-e-Pakistan ("The Thinker of Pakistan"), Shair-i-Mashriq ("The Poet of the East") and Hakeem-ul-Ummat ("The Sage of Ummah"); his birthday is annually commemorated in Pakistan as "Iqbal Day", a national holiday
 June 9 – Ovid Densusianu (aka "Ervin"; born 1873), Romanian poet, philologist, linguist, folklorist, literary historian, critic, academic and journalist
 June 26 – James Weldon Johnson (born 1871), African-American author, poet, early civil rights activist and prominent figure in the Harlem Renaissance, best known for his writing, including novels, poems and collections of folklore
 August 4 – Rudolf G. Binding (born 1867), German poet
 August 26 – Millosh Gjergj Nikolla ("Migjeni"; born 1911), Albanian poet and writer
 October 5 – Chieko Takamura (born 1886), Japanese (surname: Takamura)
 October 27 – Lascelles Abercrombie (born 1881), British poet and literary critic, one of the "Dymock poets"
 December 7 – Osip Mandelstam (born 1891), Russian poet, essayist and one of the foremost members of the Acmeist school of poets

See also

 Poetry
 List of poetry awards
 List of years in poetry

Notes

20th-century poetry
Poetry